Crematogaster cristata is a species of ant in tribe Crematogastrini. It was described by Santschi in 1929.

References

cristata
Insects described in 1929
Taxa named by Felix Santschi